Catherine McGoohan (born 31 May 1952) is a British-American actress.

Early life
McGoohan is the eldest daughter of Irish-American actor Patrick McGoohan and actress Joan Drummond. She has two younger sisters.

Career
McGoohan appeared in films and television series such as Something's Gotta Give, The Girl Next Door, Elizabethtown, General Hospital and Gilmore Girls. She appeared alongside her father in Columbo: Ashes to Ashes (1998), which he also directed.

Personal life
She moved to the United States with her parents and sisters, having previously lived in both Britain and Switzerland, in the late 1960s. She is married to film producer Cleve Landsberg; she has two daughters and a grandson.

Filmography

Film

Television

References

External links
 

1952 births
Living people
English film actresses
British people of Irish descent
English television actresses